Lloyd Raffetto also known as Lloyd A. Raffetto, Lloyd Alexander Raffetto, and "Raff" (1897-1988), was a noted Italian-American-Irish-American co-inventor of an ice cream manufacturing process, entrepreneur, and banker who owned the Raffles Hotel (now Carey House) and co-founded the Mother Lode Bank, both of Placerville, California.

Background

Lloyd Alexander Raffetto was born on December 27, 1897, in Placerville, California.  His parents were John Augustus Raffetto Sr. and Adela Creighton Raffetto.  He was the eldest of four surviving children, followed by Michael Raffetto, John Augustus Raffetto Jr., and Isadeen Adela Raffetto (future wife of Alexander Howison Murray Jr.  He attended El Dorado High School and the University of California, Berkeley, where he was a member of the Pi Kappa Alpha fraternity and manager of the agricultural journal.

Career

Raffles Hotel

In 1908, Raffetto's father bought the Cary House.  In 1915, he demolished and rebuilt it with three stories that had fifty-four rooms (fifteen with baths), coffee shop, and dining room.  Raffetto renamed it the Raffles Hotel.  It is now again the Cary House.  Historical figures known to have stayed at the hotel include Mark Twain (who used to write for the Mountain Democrat in Placerville), President Ulysses S. Grant and John Studebaker. Hollywood figures, such as actress Bette Davis, have graced the hotel. Most recently, Brooke Shields and Lou Diamond Phillips filmed a movie at the hotel.     In 1928, Raffetto co-authored a book on the manufacture ice cream that substituted powdered milk for real milk.

In 1935, Raffetto became president of the El Dorado County Chamber of Commerce, based in Placerville.

Mother Lode Bank

In February 1952, Raffetto was one of several applicants for FDIC membership.  In 1953, Raffetto became one of the organizers and long time directors of the Mother Lode Bank (1953-1975), headquartered at 447 Main Street, Placerville.  California state sentor Swift Berry served as its first president from 1953 to 1962.  In 1963, Raffetto was elected president.  In 1957, the bank applied to open a branch in Grass Valley, California.  The bank continued to expand into the 1970s.  On September 19, 1970, it opened another branch in Roseville, California with a ceremony attended by Roseville Mayor Baron Reed, bank branch manager Jerry Zak, assistant branch manager Robert Easter, local employees, and Raffetto.  The bank's name appeared often in the local Mountain Democrat newspaper, either for dividend announcements, its business condition, employee news, or sponsorship.  The bank became inactive on June 29, 1975, as part of its sale to Security Pacific National Bank (after further acquisitions most recently belonging to FIA Card Services as of 2014).

Community

In 1938, as a member of the El Dorado Chamber of Commerce's historical committee, Raffetto helped found the El Dorado Historical Society, based in Placerville. In July, the committee asked two score organization to meet the following month to "form a county historical society and... county museum."  Other committee members included:  Ernest Van Harlingen, Henry Lyon, M. T. Kelly, Joseph Quigley, Don Goodrich, and L. J. Anderson.

As a prominent businessman, in June 1949 Raffetto joined the publisher of the local newspaper and others in a Pacific Gas & Electric tour of the Feather River Project and received special birthday wishes from the newspaper for his 90th birthday.

As a member of the Lions Club, Raffetto helped the local community deal with issues such as water management.

Personal life and death

Raffetto married Ethel Quigley.  They had one son and grandson.

Raffetto was a member of E Clampus Vitus.

Raffetto died age 90 on April 5, 1988.

Legacy

Raffetto was noted for his contributions to the State of California, including the California Legislature Assembly.

Raffetto donated to the El Dorado County Library of Placerville.

Raffetto, known to have "masterminded cooking" at local events, also kept track of local lore, including the origins and recipe for the Placerville recipe for "Hangtown Fry" (see quote box).

Works

 Ice cream; a textbook for student and manufacturer (1928)
 The ice cream industry (1947)
 The ice cream industry (1956)

See also

 John Augustus Raffetto
 Michael Raffetto
 John Augustus Raffetto Jr.
 Alexander Howison Murray Jr.
 Swift Berry
 Hangtown fry

References

External sources

 Recording of Lloyd Raffetto
 CaseLaw Mother Lode Bank v. General Motors Acceptance Corporation

1897 births
1988 deaths